30 Piscium (HIP 154) is a solitary variable star in the zodiac constellation of Pisces. It is visible to the naked eye with an apparent visual magnitude of 4.37. Its net movement in the present epoch is one of moving closer – radial velocity (speed away from our star system) is −12 km/s.

This is an aging red giant star with a stellar classification of M3 III, indicating it has exhausted the hydrogen at its core and evolved off the main sequence. It is a candidate long-period variable star and has been given the designation YY Psc. It varies in brightness between magnitudes 4.31 and 4.41 with no clear period. Possible periods of 23.1, 32.0, 53.6, and 167.8 days have been identified. The star has 74 times the Sun's radius and is radiating 1,148.5 times the luminosity of the Sun from its enlarged photosphere at an effective temperature of 3,647 K.

References

M-type giants
Slow irregular variables
Pisces (constellation)
Durchmusterung objects
Piscium, 030
224935
000154
9089
Piscium, YY